The Chicago mayoral election of 1991 resulted in the re-election of incumbent Democrat Richard M. Daley to his first full-term. Daley had previously been elected to serve the remainder of Harold Washington's unexpired term in a special election held following Washington's death in office.

Daley won by a landslide 44 point margin. His most significant opponent in general election was Harold Washington Party nominee R. Eugene Pincham. Other candidates were Republican candidate George Gottlieb and Socialist Workers Party nominee James Warren, both of whom performed poorly in the vote count.

Nominations

Democratic primary
Daley handily won the Democratic nomination, fending off challenges from then-Cook County Commissioner Danny K. Davis and former mayor Jane M. Byrne.

Daley announced on December 10, 1990 that he would seek reelection. The following day Daley held a fundraiser at the Hyatt Regency Chicago which raised more than a million dollars for his campaign. This, when added to his existing campaign funds, meant that by the third day of his candidacy he already had 2 million dollars in funding. Neither of his competitors could come anywhere remotely near him in fundraising.

Daley, who won a special election in 1989, was the strong frontrunner for the Democratic nomination. A poll conducted by the Chicago Sun-Times in November 1990 showed that 58% of Chicagoan's had positive views of his performance as mayor. A Southtown Economist poll conducted after his campaign announcement showed him with a 61% approval rating, and also showed him to be polling at a 2 to 1 margin over his closest challenger, Danny Davis.

Daley benefited from a variety of factors, including solid voting blocs supporting his candidacy, his strong managerial style as mayor, and lack of public interest in local politics amid the Gulf War, which assisted Daley's hopes to have a low-profile campaign.

Davis and Byrne hoped they would be able to debate Daley. Daley, however, declined to attend any debates.

Davis had been selected as the "consensus" black candidate at a closed-door meeting held November 19, 1990 at the Hyde Park Hilton between 126 of Chicago's African-American leaders. They voted 66-60 to support Davis over Eugene Sawyer.

While Davis had planned to campaign in all areas of the city, his funds were too limited to support a citywide campaign.

Late in the primary, Tyrone Crider, the national executive director of Operation PUSH, characterized the Davis campaign as a "slow movement" because it had "failed to take the time necessary to meet and consult with the [black] religious and business community." Both Crider and PUSH founder Jesse Jackson  were upset with Davis having called a number of black ministers that had supported Daley, "Uncle Toms".

Byrne's campaign was hampered by her inability to raise funds. Her campaign was considered to be rather weak, and received no support from any significant community or business leaders.  Byrne declared that Chicago's, "deserved better leadership in City Hall". She attempted to provoke Daley into combatting with her, but he did not take her bait.

In 1991, Byrne was regarded to be most comfortable when campaigning in the African-American community.

Chicago  Sun-Times writer Steve Neal referred to her as the Norma Desmond of Chicago politics, meaning that she was delusional in her belief that she could stage a comeback.

Candidate Sheila A. Jones had also run in the previous two elections' Democratic primaries. She was a supporter of the LaRouche movement.

Black turnout was lower than it had been in the 1989 primary. Daley's share among black voters was higher than analysts had anticipated, with double-digit support.

Due to the contest being overshadowed by the Gulf War, and due to voter apathy towards the election as a result of Daley's overwhelming lead in the polls, turnout was considered low, at under 48%. This was believed to have been among the lowest turnouts in fifty years for a mayoral primary in Chicago.

Daley set a new record for the largest margin of victory in a Democratic primary, surpassing the previous record (set by his father in 1975).

Daley's performance in the primary was perceived as placing him an unbeatable position to win the general election, with Chicago being an overwhelmingly Democratic city, and the Democratic nomination being widely considered as tantamount to election. Even though he was likely to face a third-party African-American opponent, this was not seen as enough to prevent his victory (especially considering that, as a candidate, Davis had not been able to pose much of a challenge to Daley in the primary).

Results

Daley won a majority of the vote in 31 wards and Davis won a majority of the vote in the remaining 19 wards.

Results by ward

Republican primary
George S. Gotlieb defeated Alfred Walter Balciunas and WVON executive Pervis Spann. Gotlieb, a police sergeant, was not well-known.

Brette X. New had also been running initially, but withdrew.

Results

Results by ward

Harold Washington Party primary
James R. Hutchinson, who won the party primary, withdrew after winning, stepping aside for R. Eugene Pincham to assume the nomination. Hutchison was the vice-chairman of the Harold Washington Party.

To initially win the nomination, Hutchinson ran for mayor on the Harold Washington Party ticket as a write-in candidate to ensure the Harold Washington Party's place on the ballot in the general election. His strategy was to win enough write-in votes to secure the party nomination, but not enough votes to hurt Davis` chances against Daley.

Danny K. Davis had been in November 1991 by black leaders as a consensus African-American candidate to challenge Daley for mayor in the Democratic primary, and was backed by the Harold Washington Party during his Democratic primary campaign.

Hutchinson stated before the Democratic primary that if Davis did not beat Daley, Hutchison would immediately withdraw from the Washington Party ticket to allow a stronger candidate to run in the general election with assurances from Davis that he would support such a candidate.  After Davis lost to Daley, Hutchison kept his promise, stepped aside, and allowed Pincham to be the Harold Washington Party candidate for mayor.

Pincham was a former appellate judge who had left the Democratic Party after losing its 1990 nomination for Cook County Board President to Richard Phelan.

Socialist Workers nomination
The Socialist Workers Party nominated 1988 presidential candidate James Warren.

General election
Having no significant general election opponents, Daley's campaign activity was relatively minimal. He utilized strong field operations in the city's wards and distributed issue briefing papers.

Daley declined to participate in any debates.

Results
Daley won by a large margin.

Daley received roughly 25% of the African-American vote.

Daley won a majority in 31 of the city's wards, with Pincham winning a majority in the remaining 19 wards.

Results by ward

References

1991
Chicago
1991 Illinois elections
1990s in Chicago
1991 in Illinois
Richard M. Daley